Frank Jacob Slazenger Moss (birth registered first ¼ 1860 – 9 August 1938) was an English rugby union footballer who played in the 1880s. He played at representative level for England, and Lancashire, and at club level for Broughton RUFC, as a forward.

Background
Frank Moss was born at 159 York Street, Cheetham, Manchester, Lancashire, and he died aged 78 of a heart attack in Belgrade, Maine, United States.

Playing career

International honours
Frank Moss won caps for England while at Broughton RUFC in the 1885 Home Nations Championship against Wales, and Ireland, and in the 1886 Home Nations Championship against Wales.

County honours
Frank Moss won cap(s) for Lancashire while at Broughton RUFC including against Middlesex at The Oval on Saturday 12 March 1887, that was attended by the Prince of Wales (later Edward VII), and is believed to be the first rugby match attended by royalty.

Outside of rugby
Frank Moss' older brothers; Ralph Slazenger Moss and Albert Slazenger Moss founded the British sporting goods manufacturer Slazenger at Cannon Street, London in 1881. Frank Moss emigrated to New York City to manage the Slazenger business in the United States, opening a store on East 15th Street, Manhattan, New York in 1889, and later moving to East 28th Street, he took out several golf and tennis equipment patents.

Genealogical information
Frank Moss was the son of Joseph Moss, a tailor and draper, a descendant of Jewish German immigrants of the late-1700s. Frank Moss was the younger brother of Ralph Slazenger Moss (birth registered during second ¼ 1844 in Warrington district), Mordecai Moss (birth registered during second ¼ 1845 in Warrington district), Sara Slazenger Moss (birth registered during third ¼ 1847 in Warrington district), Frances Ann Slazenger Moss (Frankenburg), Ada Slazenger Moss (Cohen), Marion Slazenger Moss (birth registered during third ¼ 1853 in Manchester district), Isaac "Jack" Slazenger Moss (birth registered during second ¼ 1855 in Manchester district), rugby union footballer for Broughton RUFC, Albert (Egerton Legh) Slazenger Moss (birth registered during first ¼ 1857 in Manchester district), rugby union footballer for Broughton RUFC, Horatio "Slosh" Slazenger Moss (birth registered during fourth ¼ 1858 in Manchester district), and the older brother of Isabel "Belle" Slazenger Moss (birth registered during fourth ¼ 1861 in Manchester district), and Mindale Slazenger Moss. Frank Moss was the husband of Blanche (née Mayer) (born ) of 8439 Michigan Avenue, Chicago, they married on the evening of Monday 10 June 1907, they were the parents of Mary Slazenger Moss (born ).

References

External links
Statistics at espnscrum.com
Stones roll but Moss remains a mystery
A "possible" picture of F Moss – Sunday 11 September 1887
A Slazenger American Patent Threaded Socket And Shaft "Screw Driver," Circa Early 20th Century
Retro 1900 "Racket" by Frank Slazenger
Retro 1900 "Racket" by Frank Slazenger
The Lancashire County rugby union team that played Middlesex County at the Jubilee Football Festival, 12 March 1887

1860 births
1938 deaths
Broughton RUFC players
England international rugby union players
English Jews
English rugby union players
Jewish rugby union players
Lancashire County RFU players
Rugby union forwards
Rugby union players from Manchester